Deutsche Schule La Paz is a German international school in La Paz, Bolivia. The school serves Kindergarten through grade 12 (Sekundarstufe/Secundaria 12).

The school was founded on 10 May 1923.

See also
 Ethnic Germans in Bolivia

References

External links
  Deutsche Schule La Paz
  Deutsche Schule La Paz

La Paz
International schools in La Paz
Educational institutions established in 1923
1923 establishments in Bolivia